USS Monongahela may refer to the following ships of the United States Navy:

, was launched in 1862 and served during the American Civil War
, was an oiler acquired by the US Navy in July 1942 and decommissioned August 1957
, was an oiler launched in 1979 and decommissioned in 1999

United States Navy ship names